A list of films produced in the United Kingdom in 1958 (see 1958 in film):

1958

See also
 1958 in British music
 1958 in British television
 1958 in the United Kingdom

References

External links

1958
Films
Lists of 1958 films by country or language